Der Fels was group of German Expressionist artists that existed from around 1920 to 1927.

History
The group's origins lay in the meeting of Franz Bronstert, Fritz Fuhrken and Georg Philipp Wörlen in a World War I prisoner of war camp in Ripon, England. Other members of the group were Reinhard Hilker and the Austrian Carry Hauser. Wörlen, who was significantly older than the other members, was the driving force. At their last joint exhibition Fritz Stuckenberg also took part. All the group's artists were later condemned by the National Socialist government as entartet ("degenerate").

Der Fels published a series of eight portfolios of prints (Verlag Krieg, Leipzig). The first one also contained a manifesto by Heinz Klapproth:

"Do you see things as they are? Form is disguise, deception. Things are not as you think you see them! Therefore become still and simple, because you are looking with your eyes and seeing only the surface. The artist fights titanic battles to win the souls of things, to penetrate to their depths, to vanquish the surface. The result of this is EXPRESSION - and this is what unites the people of the Fels."

Selection of group exhibitions 
 1921: Hagen, Museum Folkwang
 1921: Hagen, Kunst-Kabinett Kollock
 1921: Landesmuseum Münster
 1922: Bremen, Graphisches Kabinett Fedelhören
 1922: Kunsthalle Düsseldorf
 1922: Kunsthalle Bremerhaven
 1922: Hamburg, Kunstsalon Maria Kunde (Graphik)
 1922: Salzburg, Moderne Galerie (Staatsgalerie)
 1922: Pfalzgalerie Kaiserslautern
 1922: Berlin, Kunstsalon Heller
 1923: Werkbundhaus Essen
 1923: Barmer Ruhmeshalle
 1923: Oldenburg, Kunstsalon Lappan
 1923: Ulm, Hermelin-Verlag
 1923: Kunsthalle Kiel
 1923: Kunsthalle Barmen
 1924: Landesmuseum Münster
 1924: Städtisches Museum Elberfeld (Von der Heydt-Museum)
 1925: Städtisches Museum Gelsenkirchen (Kunstmuseum Gelsenkirchen)
 1926: Vienna, Kunstsalon Würthle
 1926: Eisenach, Kunstsalon Messing
 1927: Städtische Gemäldegalerie Bochum (Museum Bochum – Kunstsammlung)
 1991: Passau, Museum Moderner Kunst (retrospective)

Sources 
 Otto Breicha, Franz X. Hofer and Franz Theodor Csokor: Der Fels, Künstlergemeinschaft, 1921–1927, Stiftung Wörlen, Passau 1991,  (Museumskatalog, Landstrich; Nr. 15)

References 

German artist groups and collectives
German Expressionism
1920s establishments in Germany
1927 disestablishments in Germany